From 1928-1947, the Minister of Air was, in the Government of France (and during the Vichy Regime), the cabinet member in charge of the French Air Force.  The position no longer exists and its functions have been merged with the Minister of Defense.

Ministers of Air

Third French Republic (1870–1940)

WWII (1940–1944)
Vichy

Free French Forces

Fourth French Republic (1946–1958)

See also
 Minister of the Armies (France)
 List of Naval Ministers of France

References

Air
French Air and Space Force
1928 establishments in France
1947 disestablishments in France